Mahasamund district is a district in Chhattisgarh state in central India. The city of Mahasamund is the district headquarters. The district is particularly famous for the historical temple town of Sirpur besides the Mahanadi river.

The present collector of Mahasamund is Shri Himshikhar Gupta, IAS.

Geography
Mahasamund district covers an area of 3902.39 km² in the central eastern part of Chhattisgarh. The district lies between 20°47' to 21°31'30" latitude and 82°00' and 83°15'45" longitude. On the north the district is bounded by Raigarh and Baloda Bazar districts, on the south by Bargarh and Nuapada districts of Odisha, and on the west by Gariaband and Raipur districts.

Granite rocks can be found in the Bagbahra, Basna and Pithora region. Rocks are predominantly limestone of the Chhattisgarh group contemporary to the Cuddapah group of the Upper Pre-Cambrian age, consisting of limestone layers, shale, sandstone, or quartzite. Neo-granite, dolerite, and quartz in intrusive forms are also found in the district. Hence there is a great scope of intense mining activity.

Transportation
Mahasamund district has three National Highways: National Highway 6 National Highway 217 National Highway 216. The construction of four-lane road in National Highway 6 from Arang–Mahasamund to Saraipali up to Bargarh Sambalpur Odisha has been completed.

Railway
Mahasamund railway station is an important station of the East Coast Railway zone. Mahasamund station is well connected to Raipur, Durg, Nagpur, Mumbai, Delhi, Bhopal, Gwalior, Sambalpur, Titlagarh, Visakhapatnam, Tirupati, Puri, Bilaspur, Korba, Jodhpur, Ajmer, Ahmedabad, etc., through the Indian Railways system.

Demographics

According to the 2011 census Mahasamund district has a population of 1,032,754, roughly equal to the nation of Cyprus or the US state of Rhode Island. This gives it a ranking of 438rd in India (out of a total of 640). Its population growth rate over the decade 2001–2011 was 20%. Mahasamund has a sex ratio of 1018 females for every 1000 males, and a literacy rate of 71.54%. 11.63% of the population lives in urban areas. Scheduled Castes and Scheduled Tribes make up 13.52% and 27.10% of the population respectively.

The main tribes in the district are the Gond, Binjhwar, Savar and Kawar.

At the time of the 2011 Census of India, 75.27% of the population in the district spoke Chhattisgarhi, 18.34% Odia and 5.03% Hindi as their first language.

Administration
Mahasamund district comprises five tehsils: they are Mahasamund city, Saraipali, Bagbahra, Pithora, Basana, which are further divided between twelve Police Stations and five outposts.

Politics 
The district is part of Raipur Lok Sabha constituency. Its MP is Sunil Kumar Soni from the Bharatiya Janata Party. Mahasamund has 4 assembly constituencies:

Notes

External links
 

 
Districts of Chhattisgarh